The Daga River (or Khor Daga) is a river in South Sudan.  It rises in the mountains of the Mirab Welega Zone in Ethiopia, just east of the South Sudan - Ethiopia border, where it is known as the Deqe Sonka Shet.  It flows west past the town of Daga Post and enters the Machar Marshes, where it loses its identity.

References

Rivers of South Sudan
Rivers of Ethiopia
International rivers of Africa